Philibert Smellinckx was a Belgian footballer born 17 January 1911 in Saint-Gilles, Brussels (Belgium), died 8 April 1977.

Biography 

Centre back for Union Saint-Gilloise, in the legendary Union 60 who were unbeaten in the league for 60 matches, between 9 January 1933 (Union-Lierse SK, 2-2) and 10 February 1935 (Daring Bruxelles-Union 2-0). At this time, they were three times Belgian Champions, from 1933 to 1935.

At the same time, he played for Belgium from 1933 to 1938 and played 19 matches for the Diables Rouges, including one match at the Italian World Cup.

Honours 
 Belgian international from 1933 to 1938 (19 caps)
 Participation in the 1934 World Cup in Italy (1 match)
 Selected for the 1938 World Cup in France (did not play)
 Champion of Belgium in 1933, 1934 and 1935 with R. Union Saint-Gilloise
 307 matches and 7 goals in Division 1

References 

Belgium international footballers
Royale Union Saint-Gilloise players
1911 births
People from Saint-Gilles, Belgium
1977 deaths
Belgian footballers
1934 FIFA World Cup players
1938 FIFA World Cup players
Association football defenders
Footballers from Brussels